The Toronto Police Services Board (TPSB) is the civilian police board that governs the Toronto Police Service (TPS). The board is responsible for approving the annual police budget, defining objectives and policies for TPS, and hiring Toronto's police chief.

The role of police services boards are outlined in section 31 of the provincial Police Services Act. The board makes decisions governing the structure and environment of the police service, but the chief of police leads the day-to-day operation of the police. Neither the board or its members can direct members of the police service. Only the chief of police, who is responsible to the board as a whole, receives direction on objectives, policies and priorities.

Membership of the board includes the mayor of Toronto (or a designate), two city councillors, one civilian member appointed by city council and three civilian members appointed by the province.

The board is administrative in nature and it does not investigate police conduct or complaints, as is the mandate of the Special Investigations Unit, Ontario Civilian Police Commission or Office of the Independent Police Review Director, which are oversight agencies.

Membership 
The board comprises seven members, three appointed by the Province of Ontario and four by the City of Toronto. Three civilian members are appointed by the province and one by the city; two city councillors and the mayor of Toronto as the head of council sit on the board. A chair (presently Jim Hart) and vice-chair are elected from its membership. The Police Services Act requires the board to meet at least four times a year. 

The Police Services Act also stipulates that a judge, justice of the peace, police officer, or a person who practices criminal law as a defence counsel may not be a member of a police board.

, the board members are:

History 
Prior to amalgamation, the Metropolitan Toronto Police were governed by the Metropolitan Toronto Police Services Board from 1990 until 1998. Previously, it was called the Metropolitan Toronto Police Commission (or Board of Police Commission) from 1955 until 1990, when the name of the board was changed as a result of amendments to the Police Services Act.

Former chairs

See also 

 Ministry of the Solicitor General
 Ministry of the Attorney General
 Toronto City Council

References

External links
 Toronto Police Service 

Civilian regulating boards
Toronto Police Service